This is a list of Sri Lankan One Day International cricketers.

A One Day International, or ODI for short, is an international cricket match between two representative teams, each having ODI status, as determined by the International Cricket Council (ICC). An ODI differs from a Test match in that the number of overs per team is limited, and that each team has only one innings.

The list is arranged in the order in which each player won his first ODI cap. Where more than one player won his first ODI cap in the same match, those players are listed alphabetically by surname.

Players
Statistics are correct as of 15 January 2023

Notes:
1 Sanath Jayasuriya, Chaminda Vaas, Mahela Jayawardene, Dilhara Fernando and Upul Tharanga also played ODI cricket for Asia XI. Only their records for Sri Lanka are given above.
2 Muttiah Muralitharan and Kumar Sangakkara also played ODI cricket for Asia XI and World XI. Only their records for Sri Lanka are given above.

See also
Sri Lanka national cricket team

References

ODI
Sri Lanka